The men's 3000 metres event  at the 1987 IAAF World Indoor Championships was held at the Hoosier Dome in Indianapolis on 6 and 8 March.

Medalists

Results

Heats
The first 3 of each heat (Q) and next 4 fastest (q) qualified for the final.

Final

References

3000
3000 metres at the World Athletics Indoor Championships